The Willis Family is an American reality television show about a musical family that aired on TLC in 2015 and 2016. The show follows a family of 14 from Nashville, Tennessee, demonstrating their musical and dancing skills while "sharing ... talents and balancing a life at home". The family of entertainers, known onstage as The Willis Clan, reached the quarter finals of season 9 of America's Got Talent.  Parents Toby and Brenda Willis have 12 children – eight girls and four boys.

The show was cancelled on September 11, 2016, following the arrest of Toby Willis on four counts of child rape.

Family
The family has a strong Christian and musical heritage with roots from south Chicago. They moved to Nashville in 2001 and have made regular appearances at the Grand Ole Opry.

Legal issues
Toby Willis was arrested in Kentucky on September 9, 2016 after fleeing there to avoid arrest on a child rape that occurred in Nashville in 2004.

On July 11, 2017, Willis pleaded guilty to four counts of child rape. Cheatham County Circuit Court Clerk Julie Hibbs confirmed that Willis received two 25-year sentences on two counts and two 40-year sentences on the other two. Those sentences will be concurrent, and served at 100 percent, giving Willis a total of 40 years in prison.

Speak My Mind and Comeback
In early 2018, the six eldest children besides Jessica surfaced to speak out about the abuse. On July 25, 2018, the group announced that they would "see our younger siblings on their respective roads to recovery out of the spotlight," while the other siblings besides Jessica would be touring, beginning September 7. They announced the same day that they would be releasing the single "Speak My Mind" on August 10 as a promotion for their album of the same name, released on September 28, 2018.

Episodes

Series Overview

Season 1 (2015)

Season 2 (2016)

References

TLC (TV network) original programming
2010s American reality television series
America's Got Talent contestants
2015 American television series debuts
2016 American television series endings
Television series about children
Television series about families